Serge Jonás Ibaka Ngobila (born 18 September 1989) is a Congolese-Spanish professional basketball player who last played for the Milwaukee Bucks of the National Basketball Association (NBA). Ibaka was drafted by the  Seattle SuperSonics with the 24th overall pick in the 2008 NBA draft. Ibaka is a three-time NBA All-Defensive First Team selection and has twice led the league in blocks. Although born in the Republic of the Congo, Ibaka plays for the Spain national team. In 2019, he won his first NBA championship as a key member of the Toronto Raptors.

Early life
Ibaka was born in Brazzaville, People's Republic of the Congo (modern-day Republic of the Congo), and is the third youngest of 18 children.  His father played basketball in the Republic of the Congo and with the Congolese national team, and his mother played for the Democratic Republic of the Congo. He started playing basketball at a very young age with his first club, Avenir du Rail, using the sport as an escape from his mother's untimely death and his father's imprisonment during the Second Congo War. His father organized for the family to flee the country prior to the war, but ended up as a political prisoner upon their return.

Professional career

Inter Club (2006) 
After playing for the Avenir du Rail senior team, Ibaka later joined rival club Inter Club junior team. Ibaka preferred the club because of its better structure, as it provided sneakers and meals. With Inter's senior team, he played in the 2006 FIBA Africa Clubs Champions Cup, the highest competition in Africa. There, he led the competition in rebounds and was named to the competition's All-Star Five.

L'Hospitalet (2007–2008)
In March 2007, Ibaka moved to France at the age of 17 and joined a second-division basketball team before moving to Spain, where he taught himself Spanish. In Spain, he soon began playing with a second-division basketball club CB L'Hospitalet. He averaged 10.8 points and 8.2 rebounds and shot 55%. In 2008, he entered several international showcases, picking up an MVP award at the Reebok Eurocamp and the attention of NBA scouts. An NBA scout at one of the camps said that "athletically he's off the charts—there's no telling how good he can be".

Manresa (2008–2009) 

Ibaka was selected by the Seattle SuperSonics with the 24th pick in the 2008 NBA draft. He became the first player from the Republic of Congo to be selected in the draft, although the Oklahoma City Thunder (the re-branded SuperSonics that relocated to Oklahoma City six days after the draft) agreed to keep him in Europe. He then signed a three-year contract with Ricoh Manresa from the ACB League in Spain, keeping the option to leave for the NBA after each season. In the ACB, he averaged 7.1 points, 4.5 rebounds, and 1 block in 16 minutes per game.

Oklahoma City Thunder (2009–2011) 
In July 2009, the Thunder paid the buyout for Ibaka's deal with Manresa, and signed him to a two-year contract with two more optional seasons.
Although coming to the NBA as a raw talent, Ibaka had managed to become a starter in the Thunder rotation. He was often used for his energy in the paint, whether on defense or rebounding. In his first NBA season, Ibaka played 18.1 minutes per game in 73 games, averaging 6.3 points, 5.4 rebounds and 1.3 blocks per game. His blocks average led all rookies in the 2009–10 season, and he ranked number 20 overall. In the first round of the playoffs against the Los Angeles Lakers, he played in 6 games, averaging 25.5 minutes, 7.8 points, 6.5 rebounds and 2 blocks per game. His 7 blocks in game two in Los Angeles was a record (youngest player to have 7 blocks in playoff game).

On 19 February 2011, Ibaka participated in the 2011 NBA Slam Dunk Contest. He began the contest with a free-throw line dunk. In the second round, Ibaka grabbed a stuffed animal from the rim with his mouth and dunked in one motion. However, he lost out to Blake Griffin in the competition.

Real Madrid (2011) 
During the 2011 NBA lockout, Ibaka signed a two-month contract with Real Madrid in Spain alongside Spain national basketball team teammate and friend Rudy Fernández with an option to return to the NBA at the end of the lockout. Over 6 games in the Euroleague, he averaged 5.5 points, 4.7 rebounds and 2 blocks in 15 minutes per game.

Return to Oklahoma City (2011–2016) 
After the lockout, Ibaka returned to the NBA from Spain. On 19 February 2012, he recorded his first career triple-double against the Denver Nuggets, scoring 14 points, grabbing 15 rebounds and getting a career-high 11 blocks. He played all 66 games in the shortened season as a starter, averaging the most blocks in the league, 3.6 per game. In voting for the Defensive Player of the Year, he finished second behind Tyson Chandler of the New York Knicks. In Game 4 of the Western Conference Finals against the San Antonio Spurs, Ibaka went 11–11 from the field. Oklahoma City went on to win the series in six games and advance to the 2012 NBA Finals. In the Finals Ibaka averaged 7 points and 5 rebounds, but the Thunder fell to the Miami Heat in five games.

In August 2012, Ibaka signed a four-year deal worth $48 million with the Thunder.

During the 2012–13 NBA season, Ibaka upped his scoring average from 9.1 to 13.2. He also averaged 7.7 rebounds, and a league-leading 3.0 blocks. For his defensive efforts, Ibaka finished third in Defensive Player of the Year voting, behind LeBron James and the winner, Marc Gasol. In the playoffs, the Thunder beat the Houston Rockets in 6 games, but fell to the Memphis Grizzlies in five games. Ibaka averaged 12.8 points, 8.4 rebounds, and 3 blocks in the postseason but shot only 43.7% from the field, a near 14% drop off from his regular season field goal percentage of 57.3%.

In 2013–14, Ibaka averaged career highs of 15.1 points and 8.8 rebounds per game, and led the league in total blocks (219) for the fourth straight season. In a series-clinching win over the Los Angeles Clippers in the conference semifinals, Ibaka suffered a left calf injury that was expected to sideline him for the remainder of the 2014 playoffs. However, he made his return in Game 3 against San Antonio Spurs in the Conference Finals. The Thunder eventually fell to the Spurs in six games as Ibaka averaged 12.2 points, 7.3 rebounds and 2.4 blocks throughout the playoffs. Ibaka was also named to the NBA All-Defensive First Team for the third consecutive year.

On 19 February 2015, Ibaka recorded 21 points and a career-high 22 rebounds in the 104–89 win over the Dallas Mavericks. On 17 March 2015, he was ruled out for four to six weeks after undergoing arthroscopic surgery to address right knee soreness.

On 4 January 2016, Ibaka scored a season-high 25 points in a loss to the Sacramento Kings.

Orlando Magic (2016–2017)
On 23 June 2016, Ibaka was traded to the Orlando Magic in exchange for Victor Oladipo, Ersan İlyasova and the draft rights to Domantas Sabonis, the 11th pick of the 2016 NBA draft. He made his debut for the Magic in their season opener on 26 October, recording 14 points and seven rebounds in a 108–96 loss to the Miami Heat. On 13 November 2016, he scored a career-high 31 points and hit a game-winning baseline jumper to lead the Magic to a 119–117 win over his former team, the Oklahoma City Thunder.

Toronto Raptors (2017–2020)

On 14 February 2017, Ibaka was traded to the Toronto Raptors in exchange for Terrence Ross and a future first-round draft pick (later used to draft Anžejs Pasečņiks). He made his debut for the Raptors ten days later, scoring 15 points in a 107–97 win over the Boston Celtics. On 21 March 2017, against the Chicago Bulls, Ibaka was ejected after an altercation with Bulls' center Robin Lopez. The next day, Ibaka received a one-game suspension.

On 7 July 2017, Ibaka re-signed with the Raptors to a reported three-year, $65 million contract. On January 10, 2018, he was suspended for one game without pay for an altercation with James Johnson during a game against the Miami Heat a day earlier.

On 4 November 2018, Ibaka made his first 14 shots on the way to a career-high 34 points in a 121–107 win over the Los Angeles Lakers. He finished the game 15 of 17 from the field and became the first player to start a game 14 of 14 from the field since Shaquille O'Neal did it in February 2006. On 3 February 2019, Ibaka had 16 points and 12 rebounds in a 121–103 win over the Los Angeles Clippers, marking a career-best sixth straight double-double, Toronto's longest streak since Chris Bosh had eight in November 2009. On 12 March, Ibaka was suspended for three games without pay due to an altercation with Marquese Chriss during a game against the Cleveland Cavaliers.

In June 2019, Ibaka helped the Raptors defeat the Golden State Warriors in six games during the NBA Finals to win his first NBA championship.

On 5 February 2020, Ibaka hit a game winning three pointer to lead the Raptors to a 119–118 win over the Indiana Pacers, extending the Raptors' win streak to 12, a franchise record.

Los Angeles Clippers (2020–2022)
On 25 November 2020, Ibaka signed with the Los Angeles Clippers. Ibaka was reunited with former Raptors teammate Kawhi Leonard, both of whom were part of the 2018-19 championship squad. In his first game with the Clippers, Ibaka had 15 points and 6 rebounds in a Clippers 116–109 win over the Lakers. On 24 February, 2021, Ibaka scored 21 points, grabbed 9 rebounds, and recorded 6 assists during a 128–111 win over the Cleveland Cavaliers.

Milwaukee Bucks (2022–2023)
On 10 February 2022, Ibaka was traded to the Milwaukee Bucks as part of a four-team trade that sent Rodney Hood and Semi Ojeleye to the Clippers.

On 19 July 2022, the Bucks re-signed Ibaka to a one-year contract. In January 2023, the Bucks mutually agreed with Ibaka to trade him.

On 9 February 2023, Ibaka was traded to the Indiana Pacers in a four-team trade involving the Brooklyn Nets and Phoenix Suns. He was waived by the Pacers two days later.

National team career

At youth level, Ibaka represented the Republic of the Congo. At the 2006 FIBA Africa Under-18 Championship in Durban, he led all players in scoring and rebounds with an average of 18.6 points and 13.8 rebounds respectively.

Years later, Ibaka expressed a desire to play for the Spain national basketball team. After living in the country for four years, he was granted Spanish citizenship on 15 July 2011. His team won the gold medal in the Eurobasket 2011, beating France in the final by a score of 98–85. He won a silver medal with Spain at the 2012 Summer Olympics.

Personal life
Ibaka speaks four languages: Lingala, French, English and Spanish.

Ibaka is a chef, and on his YouTube series, “How Hungry Are You”, Ibaka, who refers to himself as Mafuzzy Chef, has served numerous delicacies to his teammates, including beef penis to Kawhi Leonard and lamb brain to the Raptors bench players.

Ibaka is known for his sophisticated fashion. In 2019, he was named to Vanity Fairs Best Dressed List. Ibaka refers to his sartorial efforts as “Art”.

Ibaka has a daughter who was born shortly after he left the Republic of the Congo when he was still a teenager. She was raised by her mother and Ibaka's father, with neither Ibaka nor his daughter knowing of each other until she was three years old. They met for the first time when she was five years old.

Ibaka's younger brother, Igor, is a former NCAA basketball player for the Oklahoma State Cowboys.

On 3 April 2017, Ibaka was announced as the newest member elected to the board of directors of the National Basketball Players Association (NBPA) Foundation, the charitable arm of the NBPA which provides strategic funding and support for players' community engagement initiatives worldwide.

Ibaka is related to Romanian actor and TV host Cabral Ibacka.RelationshipsIbaka has been in relationships with Angela Simmons (2017–2018), Keri Hilson (2012–2016) and Hedisa Visapa (2011).

Career statistics

NBA

Regular season

|-
| style="text-align:left;"| 
| style="text-align:left;"| Oklahoma City
| 73 || 0 || 18.1 || .543 || .500 || .630 || 5.4 || .1 || .3 || 1.3 || 6.3
|-
| style="text-align:left;"| 
| style="text-align:left;"| Oklahoma City
| 82 || 44 || 27.0 || .543 || .000 || .750 || 7.6 || .3 || .4 || 2.4 || 9.9
|-
| style="text-align:left;"| 
| style="text-align:left;"| Oklahoma City
| style="background:#cfecec;"|  66* || style="background:#cfecec;"|  66* || 27.2 || .535 || .333 || .661 || 7.5 || .4 || .5 || style="background:#cfecec;"| 3.7* || 9.1
|-
| style="text-align:left;"| 
| style="text-align:left;"| Oklahoma City
| 80 || 80 || 31.1 || .573 || .351 || .749 || 7.7 || .5 || .4 || style="background:#cfecec;"| 3.0* || 13.2
|-
| style="text-align:left;"| 
| style="text-align:left;"| Oklahoma City
| 81 || 81 || 32.9 || .536 || .389 || .784 || 8.8 || 1.0 || .5 || 2.7 || 15.1
|-
| style="text-align:left;"| 
| style="text-align:left;"| Oklahoma City
| 64 || 64 || 33.1 || .476 || .376 || .836 || 7.8 || .9 || .5 || 2.4 || 14.3
|-
| style="text-align:left;"| 
| style="text-align:left;"| Oklahoma City
| 78 || 78 || 32.1 || .479 || .326 || .752 || 6.8 || .8 || .5 || 1.9 || 12.6
|-
| style="text-align:left;"| 
| style="text-align:left;"| Orlando
| 56 || 56 || 30.5 || .488 || .388 || .846 || 6.8 || 1.1 || .6 || 1.6 || 14.8
|-
| style="text-align:left;"| 
| style="text-align:left;"| Toronto
| 23 || 23 || 31.0 || .459 || .398 || .882 || 6.8 || .7 || .3|| 1.4 ||15.1
|-
| style="text-align:left;"| 
| style="text-align:left;"| Toronto
| 76 || 76 || 27.5 || .483 || .360 || .797 || 6.3 || .8 || .4 || 1.3 || 12.6
|-
| style="text-align:left; background:#afe6ba;"|†
| style="text-align:left;"| Toronto
| 74 || 51 || 27.2 || .529 || .290 || .763 || 8.1 || 1.3 || .4 || 1.4 || 15.0
|-
| style="text-align:left;"| 
| style="text-align:left;"| Toronto
| 55 || 27 || 27.0 || .512 || .385 || .718 || 8.2 || 1.4 || .5 || .8 || 15.4|-
| style="text-align:left;"| 
| style="text-align:left;"| L.A. Clippers
| 41 || 39 || 23.3 || .510 || .339 || .811 || 6.7 || 1.8 || .2 || 1.0 || 11.1
|-
| style="text-align:left;"| 
| style="text-align:left;"| L.A. Clippers
| 35 || 10 || 15.4 || .490 || .387 || .690 || 4.3 || 1.0 || .2 || .7 || 6.6
|-
| style="text-align:left;"| 
| style="text-align:left;"| Milwaukee
| 19 || 2 || 17.8 || .519 || .351 || .800 || 5.3 || .7 || .2 || .4 || 7.0
|-
| style="text-align:left;"| 
| style="text-align:left;"| Milwaukee
| 16 || 2 || 11.6 || .481 || .333 || .615 || 2.8 || .3 || .1 || .4 || 4.1
|- class="sortbottom"
| style="text-align:center;" colspan="2"| Career
| 919 || 697 || 27.3 || .513 || .359 || .757 || 7.1 || .8 || .4 || 1.9 || 12.0

Playoffs

|-
| style="text-align:left;"| 2010
| style="text-align:left;"| Oklahoma City
| 6 || 0 || 25.5 || .571 || - || .700 || 6.5 || .3 || .3 || 2.0 || 7.8
|-
| style="text-align:left;"| 2011
| style="text-align:left;"| Oklahoma City
| 17 || 17 || 28.8 || .462 || .000 || .825 || 7.3 || .2 || .2 || 3.1 || 9.8
|-
| style="text-align:left;"| 2012
| style="text-align:left;"| Oklahoma City
| 20 || 20 || 28.4 || .528 || .250 || .722 || 5.8 || .6 || .6 || 3.0 || 9.8
|-
| style="text-align:left;"| 2013
| style="text-align:left;"| Oklahoma City
| 11 || 11 || 33.3 || .437 || .444 || .792 || 8.4 || .7 || .0 || 3.0 || 12.8
|-
| style="text-align:left;"| 2014
| style="text-align:left;"| Oklahoma City
| 15 || 15 || 33.7 || .622 || .333 || .750 || 7.3 || .5 || .7 || 2.4 || 12.1
|-
| style="text-align:left;"| 2016
| style="text-align:left;"| Oklahoma City
| 18 || 18 || 33.4 || .521 || .449 || .750 || 6.3 || .6 || .8 || 1.3 || 12.0
|-
| style="text-align:left;"| 2017
| style="text-align:left;"| Toronto
| 10 || 10 || 30.7 || .462 || .316 || .846 || 6.5 || 1.4 || .4 || 1.7 || 14.3
|-
| style="text-align:left;"| 2018
| style="text-align:left;"| Toronto
| 10 || 9 || 26.0 || .417 || .375 || .818 || 5.9 || 1.1 || .1 || 1.3 || 8.7
|-
| style="text-align:left; background:#afe6ba;"|2019†
| style="text-align:left;"| Toronto
| style="background:#cfecec;"|  24* || 0 || 20.8 || .477 || .237 || .762 || 6.0 || .9 || .5 || 1.0 || 9.4
|-
| style="text-align:left;"| 2020
| style="text-align:left;"| Toronto
| 11 || 0 || 22.8 || .573 || .511 || 1.000 || 7.7 || 1.2 || .2 || 1.3 || 14.8|-
| style="text-align:left;"| 2021
| style="text-align:left;"| L.A. Clippers
| 2 || 0 || 9.0 || .500 || .000 || 1.000' || 2.0 || 1.0 || .5 || 1.5 || 5.0
|-
| style="text-align:left;"| 2022
| style="text-align:left;"| Milwaukee
| 6 || 0 || 3.7 || .250 || .000 || .500 || 1.7 || .0 || .0 || .0 || 1.5
|- class="sortbottom"
| style="text-align:center;" colspan="2"| Career
| 152 || 102 || 27.1 || .499 || .382 || .789 || 6.3 || .7 || .4 || 1.9 || 10.6

Euroleague

|-
| style="text-align:left;"| 2011–12
| style="text-align:left;"| Real Madrid
| 6 || 0 || 14.9 || .571 || .000 || .818 || 4.7 || .0 || .5 || 2.0 || 5.5 || 29.2
|- class="sortbottom"
| style="text-align:center;" colspan="2"| Career
| 6 || 0 || 14.9 || .571 || .000 || .818 || 4.7 || .0 || .5 || 2.0 || 5.5 || 29.2

See also

List of National Basketball Association career blocks leaders
List of National Basketball Association career playoff blocks leaders
List of National Basketball Association players with 10 or more blocks in a game
List of European basketball players in the United States

References

External links
 
 Serge Ibaka  at acb.com 
 Serge Ibaka at euroleague.net
 
 

1989 births
Living people
2014 FIBA Basketball World Cup players
Agua Caliente Clippers players
Basketball players at the 2012 Summer Olympics
Bàsquet Manresa players
CB L'Hospitalet players
Liga ACB players
Los Angeles Clippers players
Medalists at the 2012 Summer Olympics
Milwaukee Bucks players
National Basketball Association players from the Republic of the Congo
National Basketball Association players from Spain
Naturalised citizens of Spain
Oklahoma City Thunder players
Olympic basketball players of Spain
Olympic medalists in basketball
Olympic silver medalists for Spain
Orlando Magic players
Power forwards (basketball)
Real Madrid Baloncesto players
Republic of the Congo emigrants to Spain
Republic of the Congo expatriate basketball people in the United States
Republic of the Congo expatriate basketball people in Canada
Republic of the Congo men's basketball players
Seattle SuperSonics draft picks
Spanish expatriate basketball people in Canada
Spanish expatriate basketball people in the United States
Spanish men's basketball players
Spanish people of Republic of the Congo descent
Spanish sportspeople of African descent
Sportspeople from Brazzaville
Toronto Raptors players
Republic of the Congo people of Democratic Republic of the Congo descent
Spanish people of Democratic Republic of the Congo descent
Republic of the Congo expatriate basketball people in Spain